Al Tilal Aden is a Yemeni professional basketball club based in Aden. The club competes in the Yemen's D1 League.

Traditionally, the club has provided several of Africa's and Asia's national teams with key players.

References

External links
Presentation at Asia-basket.com

Basketball teams in Yemen
Sport in Aden
Basketball teams established in 1905
1905 establishments in the British Empire